Earnest James Ujaama (born 1965 or 1966) is an American community activist and former terrorist suspect.

A long-term resident of Seattle and well-known community activist, Ujaama was arrested under terrorism charges in July 2002, the first American to be detained on U.S. soil while under investigation using the Patriot Act. Amid conflicting reports and media coverage of the extent of his involvement in terrorist networks, he has since been convicted three times of various offences, in 2003, 2007, and 2015.

Early life 
Ujaama was born James Earnest Thompson in Denver in 1965, and moved to Seattle while still a child. He was born a Catholic. His mom, Peggy Thompson, was a social worker at the Central Area Motivation Program. At the age of 9, Thompson began a business in raking leaves; at the age of 14, he started a business in home maintenance. Thompson studied at Ingraham High School. Before he even graduated from high school, he enrolled in the University of Washington, but dropped out after two years. 

In the mid-1980s, Thompson moved to Pelican, Alaska, where he worked at a seafood company.

At age 22, Thompson bought and ran a computer store in the University District of Seattle, renaming it Campus Computers. He sold it after six months.

In the early 1990s, Thompson moved back to Seattle. There, he worked for Olympic Computers selling IBM computers, but was accused of carrying out scams on his customers. 

Thompson also wrote the motivational book The Young People's Guide to Starting a Business Without Selling Drugs and the semi-autobiographical novel Coming Up. He then moved to Los Angeles to try to make his novel into a movie, without success. Also in the early 1990s, Thompson changed his name to Earnest James Ujaama; he had followed his brother Mustafa Ujaama – born Jon Thompson – who had converted to Islam earlier while in the military.

In 1993, Ujaama, funded by a grant from the city of Seattle, taught a class at Seattle Vocational Institute.

Ujaama was invited to speak at the 1994 NAACP convention in Chicago.

On June 10, 1994, then-state representative Jesse Wineberry declared it to be "James Ujaama Day" in the state of Washington.

Involvement with radical Islam (1996–2002) 
In late 1996, Ujaama returned to Seattle, where he converted to Islam circa 1997. Ujaama then moved to London and studied under Jamaican-born cleric Abdullah el-Faisal. Moving between London and Seattle, Ujaama eventually started selling tapes of el-Faisal's sermons, but kept the proceeds. While in London, Ujaama married a Muslim woman from Somalia. In late 1998, Ujaama spent two weeks in a jihad training camp in Afghanistan. Ujaama later studied under Abu Hamza al-Masri, attending the Finsbury Mosque. 

In late 1999, Ujaama returned to the United States, where he learned about a ranch in Bly, Oregon. That October, he traveled to the ranch, where he carried out firearm practice; he sent a fax to Abu Hamza to promote this idea, but he greatly exaggerated his progress. He also drafted a flyer that said "Get away from dunia [earthly matters] and be among Muslims!", advertising a cost of / (including airfare).

In November/December 1999, Oussama Kassir and Haroon Aswat (emissaries from Abu Hamza) came to Bly to inspect the property. (They arrived in New York City on an Air India flight on November 26, 1999; afterwards, they rode a Greyhound bus to Seattle, and were then driven by Ujaama to Bly.) However, Kassir and Aswat realized upon their arrival that there was nothing in the ranch, and that Ujaama had been running a scam.

In January 2000, Ujaama moved back to London. 

From 2000 to 2001, Ujaama (under the alias Bilal Ahmed) operated the Supporters of Shariah website, which was used to advocate "violent jihad".

During this period, Ujaama was also known as Abu Samayya or Abdul Qaadir.

Terrorism charges (2002–2015) 
On July 22 or July 25, 2002, Ujaama was arrested at his grandmother's former house in Denver under a material witness warrant, becoming the first American to be detained on U.S. soil while under investigation using the Patriot Act. He was charged by federal grand jury on August 28, 2002. (The lead FBI agent in the case testified that he did not believe Ujaama needed to be locked up.) In the government's original indictment, Ujaama was charged with:

 one count of "Conspiracy to Provide Material Support and Resources"
 one count of "Using. Carrying, Possessing. and Discharging Firearms During a Crime of Violence"

Ujaama eventually admitted to aiding the Taliban as part of a plea deal. He pled guilty to violating the IEEPA for installing software for a friend to use on a computer owned by the Taliban, and "conspiring to take Feroz Abassi to go and fight with the Taliban against the Northern Alliance." He was sentenced on this charge in April 2003. In exchange for two years in jail, Ujaama agreed to testify against Abu Hamza, Oussama Kassir, and Haroon Aswat. All three were charged by prosecutors, but resisted extradition.

In December 2006, Ujaama fled to Belize, but was arrested there again. Returning to Manhattan, he again pleaded guilty in 2007 and was sentenced to four further years in jail. He again testified against Kassir in 2009 and against Abu Hamza in 2014.

On October 23, 2015, Ujaama was sentenced for a third time at a U.S. district court in Manhattan. He has since been released.

Later life (2015–present) 
Since 2015, Ujaama lives either in Berkeley or Seattle. He has engaged in doctoral studies at the University of Washington.

Selected bibliography 
 Ujaama, Ej. (1991). Young People's Guide to Starting a Business. Self-published.
 Ujaama, Ej. (1993). Entrepreneur Basics 101. Seattle, WA: Be Your Own Boss Publishing.
 Ujaama, Ej. (1994). How to Be An Entrepreneur. Seattle, WA: Be Your Own Boss Publishing.
 Ujaama, Ej. (1996). Coming Up. Seattle, WA: Inner-City Publishing.

References

External links 
 

1960s births
Living people
American activists
University of Washington alumni
Antioch University alumni
Walden University alumni
Inmates of ADX Florence
Year of birth missing (living people)